The HOT (French: Haut subsonique Optiquement Téléguidé Tiré d'un Tube, or High Subsonic, Optical, Remote-Guided, Tube-Launched) is a second-generation long-range anti-tank missile system. It was originally developed to replace the older SS.11 wire guided missile in French and West German service. The design was a collaboration between the German firm Bölkow and the French firm Nord. Bölkow and Nord later merged into MBB and Aérospatiale respectively, both of which then formed Euromissile to design and produce the MILAN, Roland and HOT. This ultimately became part of MBDA.

In comparison to the SS.11, HOT has longer range, flies faster, and is semi-automatically guided instead of manually. It has become one of the most successful missiles of its class, with tens of thousands of missiles produced, used by no fewer than a dozen countries worldwide, and validated in combat in several wars. The missile system is also commonly mounted on light and medium armored vehicles, and attack helicopters.

HOT entered limited production in 1976, with mass production of 800 missiles a month reached in 1978. HOT initially became operational with the German and French armies fitted to specialized armored antitank vehicles. In addition, Euromissile received large export orders from Middle East nations at the start of mass production. This was likely due to the situation in the late 1970s where many nations did not want to rely solely on arms purchases from the Soviets combined with the U.S. Congress restrictions on the export sales of the TOW antitank missile.

In Europe, the end of the service life of the HOT missile system is in sight with the French opting to purchase Hellfire II missiles for their Tiger-HAD attack helicopters and the Germans planning to transition to the PARS 3 LR. Austria has decommissioned its HOT-carrying tank destroyers, while Spain is transitioning to Spike missiles to replace their HOT missile inventory. The HOT missile continues to be in widespread use in other areas of the world.

Design and function

Project studies by both firms started in 1964, at about the same time the US Army started a project that resulted in the TOW missile. Unlike TOW, which entered service in 1973, the development and testing phase for HOT took considerably longer. The design goal was to produce an antitank missile that could be fired from both vehicles and helicopters; that employed the SACLOS guidance system instead of the less reliable MCLOS system used by the SS.11; had a longer range combined with a better minimum engagement range; had a higher missile speed than the SS.11 resulting in a shorter flight time; and packed in a sealed container that also served as the launcher.

The HOT missile is tube-launched and optically tracked using the SACLOS guidance system with command link through trailing wires which steers the missile using thrust vector controls on the sustainer motor during the missile's flight. When the gunner fires the HOT missile, the missile activates a thermal battery, flares and a small gas generator spins up the gyro. The same gases for the gyro pop the covers off both ends of the cylindrical container the HOT missile comes packed in. Moments later, both the sustainer motor and the booster are fired, ejecting the missile from the container.

Unlike most antitank missiles, in which the booster burns completely before leaving the container and then the missile coasts a safe distance before the sustainer motor ignites, HOT's booster burns both inside the container and outside the container for approximately one second giving the missile a high speed. The sustainer motor burns for 17 seconds, a flight time whose path exceeds the length of the trailing wires which dictate the maximum range of the missile. Because of the more powerful booster and sustainer motor that burns during its complete flight, the HOT missile had a much shorter flight time than any other wire guided antitank missiles when it was introduced. The booster's four nozzles are located at the roots of the four spring out fins. The sustainer motor's single exhaust is located in the rear of the missile body, where a vane controls the missile through thrust vector control as it rotates in flight.

After the missile is fired, all the gunner has to do is keep the target in the sight's cross hairs, and the system will automatically track the missile's rear-facing flares, gather the missile into the gunner's sight, and send commands to steer the missile into the gunner's line of sight. Approximately 50 meters after ejecting from the container, the safety system arms the HEAT warhead's fuze and will detonate when the outer skin of the two-layer nose cone is crushed to contact with the inside skin, completing an electrical circuit. With this type of fuzing system, the missile does not have to hit the tip of the missile's nose to detonate the HEAT warhead. The HOT 1 and HOT 2 use the warhead fuzing system previously described.

The latest version of the HOT family, the HOT 3, uses tandem charge feature to defeat tanks fitted with explosive reactive armor. A laser-proximity fuze located in the front half of the nose measures the distance between the target and the missile. At the correct range, the small nipple on the front nose containing a small HEAT warhead is ejected forward from the missile body to pre-detonate the reactive armor followed by the detonation of main HEAT warhead.

Performance relative to comparable weapons

Launch platforms

HOT missiles have been deployed on both vehicles and helicopters.

The Bundeswehr upgraded the Raketenjagdpanzer 2 tank destroyer to use the HOT missile in what was designated as the Jaguar 1. The Jaguar 1 mounted a single Euromissile K3S launcher and carried 20 HOT missiles, one of which was carried in the launcher. This tank destroyer was also used by Austria.

France developed a variant of the AMX-10P that substituted an armored four-tube HOT missile launcher called the Lancelot for the vehicle's regular 20mm cannon turret. The Lancelot turret carriers 20 HOT missiles—4 mounted and 16 stored inside—and uses a sight with X12 magnification as well as a laser rangefinder. The only known customer is Saudi Arabia.

HOT missiles have also been mounted on wheeled vehicles such as the Panhard VCR/TH and the VAB VCAC with the Mephisto turret. Both the VCR and the VCAC carried four ready-to-launch missiles. The main advantage that the VAB Mephisto turret has over the TH turret is that both the operator and the missiles are both under armor and the Mephisto turret can be retracted flush with the vehicle's top for loading on either the C-130 or C-160 transport aircraft.

In an unusual move, in 1986 Euromissile offered a single-round ground-launched system for HOT missiles called ATLAS (Affut de Tir Leger Au Sol - which approximately translates as light ground-firing mount) for installation on smaller unarmored vehicles, like the Jeep or Land Rover. The object was to field an antitank weapon that long-range patrols could use to engage heavy armor beyond the range of the tank's main cannon. The ATLAS is similar to the TOW mounted on various four-wheel-drive light vehicles. But, unlike the TOW light vehicle mount, there is a shield to protect the gunner against the HOT's booster and sustainer motors, which are both burning as they exit the container. The vehicle mounting the ATLAS is expected to carry a mix of both HOT missiles with antitank warheads and the HOT with the multi-purpose warhead.

Shortly after the introduction of HOT by Germany and France on ground vehicles, both nations introduced helicopters in the dedicated antitank role firing the HOT. The French used the Gazelle SA342M helicopter, which carries four HOT missiles in two dual launchers. Germany opted for the Bo-105 PAH-1, which is capable of carrying six HOT missiles in two triple launchers. Subsequently, the HOT missile was qualified for launch from other helicopters, such as the German Tiger helicopter (carrying up to eight HOT's in two quad launchers) and the South African Rooivalk helicopter.

Service history

By 1975, development was complete and evaluations had been performed by various ministries of defence. Mass production commenced in 1976  and the first HOT missiles were fielded in 1978. A night-sight for firing from helicopters, the Viviane, was developed in the early 1980s. In 1985, the HOT-2 followed, with a multipurpose warhead variant called the HOT-2MP entering service in 1992. While less effective in terms of armor penetration, the HOT-2MP also produces fragmentation and incendiary effects.

By 1987, 1,434 launchers and 70,350 missiles had been produced. HOT-3 was brought into service in 1998 and has a tandem shaped-charge HEAT warhead capable of breaching explosive reactive armor as well as improved anti-jamming capabilities. HOT-3 was selected to be the missile armament of the Tiger attack helicopter for Germany at least until the PARS 3 LR becomes available.

HOT has been used in combat in several wars, including the Iran-Iraq War, Lebanon, Chad, Western Sahara, the Gulf War of 1991 and in Lebanon in May 2007 against the Fatah al-Islam militants in the Nahr el-Bared camp north of Tripoli. In June 2011, French Gazelles helicopters fired HOT missiles on various pro-Qaddafi targets as part of the NATO operations enforcing UN Resolution 1973.

Various reports state that the first combat use of the HOT was with the Iraqi Army during the Iran-Iraq War, launched from Panhard VCR/TH 6x6 wheeled armored vehicles fitted with the UTM-800 turret. Photos have also recorded captured examples of the VCR/TH in service with the Iranian Army.

The missile has been recently used by the Syrian Army, in their fight against ISIL, particularly in the Palmyra offensive.

Variants

MBDA has taken over Euromissile and now handles production of all current variants, as well as HOT development.

Time to target at maximum range is 17.3 seconds with an average speed of 832 kilometers per hour.

Operators

Data extracted from Jane's World Armies Issue 23 and the SIPRI Arms Transfers Database.

Current operators

See also
BGM-71 TOW (USA)
AT-5 Spandrel (Russia)
HJ-8 (China)

References

Notes

Bibliography

Gunston, Bill (1983). An Illustrated Guide to Modern Airborne Missiles. London: Salamander Books Ltd. .
Lennox, Duncan (ed.) (2000). Jane's Air-Launched Weapons. Coulsdon: Jane's Information Group Ltd. .
TRADOC Worldwide Equipment Guide at fas.org

External links

www.fas.org 
manufacturer's site
since 1979 ... Try Asking for Peace

Anti-tank guided missiles of Germany
Anti-tank guided missiles of France
Anti-tank guided missiles of the Cold War
France–Germany military relations
Military equipment introduced in the 1970s